The 2008 Irish American Football League (IAFL) season is the 22nd season since its establishment. The current champions are the UL Vikings. The first games were played on 30 March (after the 16 March game between 
DCU Saints and UL Vikings was postponed due to a waterlogged pitch). The
Shamrock Bowl was scheduled for 10 August in Cork Institute of Technology's brand new stadium. The Shamrock Bowl was the first major national event played there.

The 2008 season also has seen the first season of the new Development League, dubbed DV8. This is an eight a side league dedicated to helping rookie players and new teams get some experience before joining the league proper.

Results

Week 1

 Carrickfergus Knights 18-7 DCU Saints
 Dublin Rebels 16-0 Belfast Trojans
 Belfast Bulls 0-66 Cork Admirals

Week 2

 Dublin Rhinos 0-25 Carrickfergus Knights
 Belfast Trojans 0-22 UL Vikings
 Tallaght Outlaws 0-98 Cork Admirals

Week 3

 Dublin Rebels 64-0 Dublin Rhinos
 UL Vikings 22-6 Belfast Bulls
 DCU Saints 44-0 Tallaght Outlaws

Week 4

 Belfast Bulls 8-24 Belfast Trojans
 Cork Admirals 6-0 Dublin Rebels

Week 5

 Dublin Rhinos	3-32 D.C.U. Saints	
 Belfast Trojans 42-0 Carrickfergus Knights	
 Tallaght Outlaws 0-36 Univ. of Limerick Vikings

Week 6

 DCU Saints 0-25 Dublin Rebels
 Cork Admirals 3-20 UL Vikings
 Carrickfergus Knights 14-30 Belfast Bulls

Week 7

 Tallaght Outlaws 0-34 Dublin Rhinos
 Belfast Trojans 30-14 Belfast Bulls

Week 8

 Cork Admirals 60-0 Tallaght Outlaws
 Dublin Rhinos 0-52 Dublin Rebels
 Carrickfergus Knights 19-44 Belfast Trojans

Week 9

 UL Vikings 34-25 Cork Admirals
 Dublin Rebels 39-0 DCU Saints
 Belfast Bulls 26-14 Carrickfergus Knights

Week 10

 UL Vikings 92-0 Tallaght Outlaws

Week 11

 DCU Saints 32-6 Dublin Rhinos

Week 12

 Cork Admirals 44-32 Carrickfergus Knights
 Belfast Bulls 0-72 Dublin Rebels
 Belfast Trojans 56-0 Dublin Rhinos

Week 13

 Tallaght Outlaws 0-30 Belfast Trojans
 Dublin Rebels 32-14 UL Vikings

Week 14

 Dublin Rhinos 6-34 Cork Admirals
 Carrickfergus Knights 30-0 Tallaght Outlaws (Note: Tallaght forfeited the game and subsequently retired from the league)
 DCU Saints 6-0 Belfast Bulls

Week 15

 UL Vikings 47-12 DCU Saints

Wildcard Weekend

 DCU Saints 2-34 Cork Admirals

Remaining Fixtures

Semi-final

 Belfast Trojans 8 - 52 UL Vikings
 Cork Admirals 12 - 19 Dublin Rebels

Shamrock Bowl XXII

 10 August, CIT Stadium, Cork

Dublin Rebels(H)12 vs 14 University of Limerick Vikings(A)

DV8’s League

League Positions

Note: W = Wins, L = Losses, T = Ties
DV8’s League Table

In the DV8's League, a win is worth four points, scoring three touchdowns is worth one extra point and losing by less the 7 points is worth one extra point e.g. a team could lose 24-30 and still gain 2 points, due to scoring three touchdowns and losing by less than seven points.

DV8 Results

 9 March – Edenderry Soldiers 6-67 Craigavon Cowboys
 20 March – Edenderry Soldiers 0-22 Cork Admirals 2nd
 5 April – TCD Thunderbolts 12-45 Craigavon Cowboys
 6 April – Dublin Dragons 0-24 Cork Admirals 2nd
 19 April – Craigavon Cowboys 52-8 TCD Thunderbolts
 19 April – Edenderry Soldiers 6-34 Dublin Dragons
 20 April - Cork Admirals 2nd 6-12 Dublin Rebels 2nd
 28 April - Dublin Rebels 2nd 65-0 Edenderry Soldiers
 4 May - TCD Thunderbolts 8-39 Dublin Rebels 2nd
 11 May - Dublin Dragons 20-51 TCD Thunderbolts
 18 May - Cork Admirals 2nd 14-0 TCD Thunderbolts
 25 May - Dublin Rebels 2nd 22-0 TCD Thunderbolts
 25 May - Dublin Dragons 60-20 Edenderry Soldiers
 1 June - Craigavon Cowboys 51-13 Dublin Dragons
 8 June - Dublin Rebels 2nd 25-0 Craigavon Cowboys
 14 June - Cork Admirals 2nd 45-13 Dublin Dragons
 14 June - Craigavon Cowboys 13-6 Dublin Rebels 2nd

DV8's Playoffs

Wildcard Match

 Craigavon Cowboys 0-34 Dublin Rebels

Final
 Dublin Rebels @ Cork Admirals

External links 
 IAFL official website

Irish American Football League
Iafl Season, 2008
2008 in Irish sport